Catastrophe: Risk and Response is a 2004 book by the economist Richard Posner, in which the author advocates the use of a cost–benefit framework to address potential major disasters such as runaway global warming and planet-obliterating asteroids.

See also
 Global catastrophic risks

References

External links
 The New York Times review
 Journal of Economic Literature review

2004 non-fiction books
2004 in the environment
American non-fiction books
Books by Richard Posner
Climate change books
English-language books
Oxford University Press books